Hussein Hasan was a famous Somali poet and warrior of the Eidagale Isaaq clan known for his skills in battle and hot temper.

Biography
Hussein belonged to the Rer Guled branch of the Eidagale and was a great grandson of the 1st Isaaq Sultan Guled Abdi.

War within the Eidagale
Tensions were high between the Rer Guled and another subclan of Eidagale. Hussein urged his Rer Guled to continue their conflict. Standing against Hussein was a similarly skilled poet & warrior Hersi Absiyeh, a prominent member of the closely related Rer Abdi Bari who were warring with the Rer Guled. In response to this fighting Sultan Deria Hassan himself a member of the Rer Guled called for the regular shir or meeting of subclans where he would take council and advise on what decisions to make next for the Eidagale. Sultan Deria ruled that blood payment or mag was sufficient for both parties to exchange at the shir with the Rer Guled losing six and the Abdi Bari six as well. Hussein stood and recited a rousing gabay rejecting the decision.

Sultan Deria responded by sending Hussein away to Berbera and then resuming the shir. Absiyeh was made to swear a solemn oath not to recite a gabay following the Sultan's decision but he could not resist, especially since Hussein was away. Hussein returned and lamented that he missed the occasion and the two other men (Deria & Absiyeh) prevailed that day.

Mangalool

Hussein's famed horse Mangalool was the topic of poetry and envy across Somaliland and many notables would inquire about how they could obtain the steed both Somalis and British alike. Hussein would accompany Lord Delamere in 1893 on a lion hunting expedition in which a lioness nearly killed him and his horse Mangalool in a pursuit they narrowly escaped. Hussein would refuse to put a price on Mangalool as he was nearly impossible to catch after raids and he made a great income off looting livestock from his enemies. He would run into Lord Delamere again in 1894 and narrated an amazing story that happened to him in the year since. Following a successful raid of numerous camels, Hussein had split from his party to avoid detection. Given that it was a particularly dry year Mangalool had collapsed from fatigue and could not continue any further. To rescue his horse, Hussein rushed his looted camels to the nearest wells and made them drink as much water as possible, before returning to Mangalool. He then slaughtered a camel periodically along the 20 mile route back to the safe well and would give Mangalool water from the camels he killed. He stated he would rather kill 100 camels than lose his horse, and that with Mangalool he'd easily gain many more camels than he slaughtered now that he had his horse back.

See also
Salaan Carrabey
Sultan Deria Hassan
Kite Fiqi
Farah Nur
Garhajis
Isaaq

References

Somalian Muslims
19th-century Somalian people
20th-century Somalian people
19th-century poets
20th-century poets
Year of birth missing
African warriors
History of Somaliland